Lucas Andrew Falk (born December 28, 1994) is an American football quarterback who is a free agent. He played college football at Washington State, and was drafted by the Tennessee Titans in the sixth round of the 2018 NFL Draft. He has played for the Tennessee Titans, Miami Dolphins, and the New York Jets.

Falk started the 2019 season as the third quarterback on the roster of the New York Jets and played in three games, due to an illness affecting starting quarterback Sam Darnold and an injury to Trevor Siemian sustained in week two of the regular season. Falk struggled with the Jets and was released mid-season following Darnold's return.

Early years
Falk was born in Logan, Utah and moved to California where he attended Oaks Christian School in Westlake Village. He has two older sisters, Alexa Shea Falk Johns and Natalee Marie Falk, who formed a sibling country music duo Falk. Prior to his junior year, he moved back to Logan and attended Logan High School. As a senior, he threw for 3,618 yards with 36 touchdowns and broke Utah records for pass attempts (562) and pass completions (330).

College career
Falk originally committed to Cornell University but de-committed following the departure of head coach Kent Austin. Falk then joined Washington State University as a walk-on. After redshirting in 2013, Falk entered 2014 as the backup to Connor Halliday. After Halliday was injured, Falk took over as the starter for the final three games.  In his first career start he threw for 471 yards and five touchdowns and earned conference offensive player and national quarterback of the week honors. Overall, he appeared in six games, completing 156 of 243 passes for 1,859 yards with 13 touchdowns and seven interceptions.  He retained his starting job for the 2015 season and proceeded to lead the nation in passing yards per game (380.5), while finishing second in the nation in pass completion percentage (69.45), and earning first-team all-Pac-12 honors, becoming the ninth Washington State quarterback in the 100-year of the conference to be named first-team. He guided the 2015 Cougars to a 9-3 record that included a Sun Bowl win over Miami and dramatic, come-from-behind victories over UCLA, Oregon and Rutgers. Falk adheres to a strict diet to enhance performance, and wears a signature wristband in every game to salute his favorite youth basketball coach who died unexpectedly. As of week 12 of the 2017 season, Falk holds Pac-12 Football records for career passing attempts, completions, completion percentage, passing yards, and passing touchdowns. On January 26, 2018, Falk announced that he would forgo the Senior Bowl to attend the funeral for Tyler Hilinski.

College statistics

Professional career

Tennessee Titans
Falk was drafted by the Tennessee Titans in the sixth round (199th overall) of the 2018 NFL Draft. He played in every preseason game while starting the final game against the Vikings. On September 1, 2018, Falk was waived by the Titans.

Miami Dolphins
On September 2, 2018, Falk was claimed off waivers by the Miami Dolphins. He was placed on injured reserve on October 5, 2018 with a wrist injury.

On May 1, 2019, the Dolphins waived Falk.

New York Jets
On May 2, 2019, Falk was claimed off waivers by the New  York Jets. He was waived on August 31, 2019 and was signed to the practice squad the next day. On September 12, 2019, Falk was promoted to the active roster. He made his NFL regular season debut on Monday Night Football against the Cleveland Browns on September 16, 2019 after an injury to backup quarterback Trevor Siemian, who himself made the start in place of Sam Darnold, who was out with mononucleosis. Falk finished his first NFL game 20-of-25 with 198 yards and a quarterback rating of 99.7. Making his first career start against the defending Super Bowl champion New England Patriots in Week 3, Falk was only able to pull off 98 passing yards on 12 out of 22 completions with an interception as the Jets lost 30-14. Following a bye week, Falk made his second career start against the Philadelphia Eagles in Week 5, where he finished with 120 passing yards and 2 interceptions as the Jets lost 31-6.  He was waived on October 12.

Falk had a tryout with the San Francisco 49ers on August 13, 2020.

Saskatchewan Roughriders
Falk signed with the Saskatchewan Roughriders of the CFL on February 19, 2021. He was placed on the suspended list on July 3, 2021. He was released on July 24, 2021.

References

External links
 New York Jets bio
 Washington State Cougars bio

1994 births
Living people
Players of American football from Utah
Sportspeople from Logan, Utah
American football quarterbacks
Washington State Cougars football players
Tennessee Titans players
Miami Dolphins players
New York Jets players
Saskatchewan Roughriders players